SMS für Dich is a 2016 German romantic drama film directed and co-written by Karoline Herfurth, based on the 2009 novel of the same name by Sofie Cramer. It stars Herfurth, Friedrich Mücke, Nora Tschirner, Frederick Lau and Katja Riemann.

Cast 
 Karoline Herfurth - Clara
 Friedrich Mücke - Mark
 Nora Tschirner - Katja
 Frederick Lau - David
 Katja Riemann - Henriette Boot
 Enissa Amani - Niki
 Friederike Kempter - Fiona
 Samuel Finzi - Wortmann
  - Kalle
 Cordula Stratmann - Ulli Volkowitz

Remake 

An American remake, titled Love Again, was written and directed by James C. Strouse, and stars Priyanka Chopra, Sam Heughan, and Celine Dion. It is scheduled to be released on 12 May 2023.

References

External links 

2016 romantic drama films
2010s German films
2010s German-language films
Films based on German novels
Films based on romance novels
German romantic drama films
Warner Bros. films